Auke Lake (Áak'w or Yax̱te in Tlingit, literally 'little lake') is a  lake located in Auke Bay in Juneau, Alaska.

Dolly Varden, cutthroat, steelhead and four varieties of salmon all live in Auke Lake. The views of Mt. McGinnis and the Towers from the Glacier Hwy side of Auke Lake are one of the most photographed in Juneau and Alaska. Other claims to fame include the flamingo house and the Auke Lake Curling Club.

External links
 https://web.archive.org/web/20120503113823/http://juneauempire.com/stories/050408/out_275269315.shtml
 https://web.archive.org/web/20151203201753/http://juneauempire.com/local/2012-04-04/photo-ready-river
 https://web.archive.org/web/20140803092713/http://juneauempire.com/local/2014-03-07/winter-sport-takes-stones#.UxwBN9__5k8

Lakes of Juneau, Alaska
Lakes of Alaska